This is a list of the artists who recorded for Grand Royal.

 Derek Allan
 Alec Empire
 Atari Teenage Riot
 At the Drive-In
 Bash Ton
 Beastie Boys
 Big Fat Love
 Bis
 Bran Van 3000
 BS 2000
 Buffalo Daughter
 Butter 08
 Dead Fucking Last
 De Facto
 EC8OR
 DJ Hurricane
 Jimmy Eat World
 Kostars
 Ladies Who Lunch
 Ben Lee
 Sean Lennon
 Liquid Liquid
 Luscious Jackson
 Mika Bomb
 Mr. Lif
 Moistboyz
 Money Mark
 Noise Addict
 Nullset
 The Prunes
 Rosita
 Russell Simins
 Scapegoat Wax
 Shizuo
 Siud
 DJ Strictnine & Paranorm
 Sukpatch
 Techno Animal
 The Josephine Wiggs Experience
 The Latch Brothers

See also
 Grand Royal
 GR2 Records

Grand Royal